The 140th New York State Legislature, consisting of the New York State Senate and the New York State Assembly, met from January 3 to October 2, 1917, during the third year of Charles S. Whitman's governorship, in Albany.

Background
Under the provisions of the New York Constitution of 1894, re-apportioned in 1906 and 1907, 51 Senators and 150 assemblymen were elected in single-seat districts; senators for a two-year term, assemblymen for a one-year term. The senatorial districts were made up of entire counties, except New York County (twelve districts), Kings County (eight districts), Erie County (three districts) and Monroe County (two districts). The Assembly districts were made up of contiguous area, all within the same county.

At this time there were two major political parties: the Republican Party and the Democratic Party. The Socialist Party, the Prohibition Party, the Progressive Party, the Independence League, the Socialist Labor Party and the American Party also nominated tickets.

Elections
The New York state election, 1916, was held on November 7. Charles S. Whitman and Edward Schoeneck were re-elected Governor and Lieutenant Governor; both Republicans. The other eight statewide elective offices were also carried by Republicans. The approximate party strength at this election, as expressed by the vote for Governor, was: Republicans 836,000; Democrats 687,000; Socialists 63,000; Prohibition 22,000; Progressives 7,000; Independence League 5,000; Socialist Labor 4,000; and American 2,000.

Sessions
The Legislature met for the regular session at the State Capitol in Albany on January 3, 1917; and adjourned on May 10.

Thaddeus C. Sweet (R) was re-elected Speaker.

Elon R. Brown (R) was re-elected Temporary President of the State Senate.

The Legislature redistricted the Senate seats, and re-apportioned the number of assemblymen per county. Bronx County—which had been part of New York County at the time of the previous apportionment and occupied roughly the area of four Assembly districts—was properly separated, and was apportioned eight seats. New York County (without the Bronx) lost eight seats; and Erie, Jefferson and Ulster counties lost one seat each. Queens County gained two seats; and Broome, Nassau, Richmond, Schenectady and Westchester counties gained one seat each.

The Legislature met for a special session at the State Capitol in Albany on July 31, 1917. This session was called to enact food control legislation, which would regulate the seizure and shipping of food to the Allies in Europe, helping them with their war effort against Germany during World War I.

On August 24, the Food Control Bill was passed by the Legislature. The bill established a three-member Food Control Commission. The Legislature took a recess until September 6.

On September 7, the State Senate rejected the nomination of George Walbridge Perkins as Chairman of the Food Control Commission, and took a recess until September 25.

On October 2, the State Senate rejected again the nomination of Perkins; and then confirmed the appointment of John Mitchell, Jacob Gould Schurman and Charles A. Wieting to the Food Control Commission. The Legislature then adjourned sine die.

State Senate

Districts

Members
The asterisk (*) denotes members of the previous Legislature who continued in office as members of this Legislature. Salvatore A. Cotillo, John Knight, Ross Graves and Leonard W. H. Gibbs changed from the Assembly to the Senate.

Note: For brevity, the chairmanships omit the words "...the Committee on (the)..."

Employees
 Clerk: Ernest A. Fay
 Sergeant-at-Arms: Charles R. Hotaling
 Stenographer:

State Assembly
Note: For brevity, the chairmanships omit the words "...the Committee on (the)..."

Assemblymen

Employees
 Clerk: Fred W. Hammond
 Sergeant-at-Arms: Harry W. Haines
Postmaster: James H. Underwood
General Clerk: Wilson Messer

Notes

Sources
 NEXT LEGISLATURE FIRMLY REPUBLICAN in NYT on November 8, 1916
 REPUBLICANS GAIN MORE LEGISLATORS in NYT on November 9, 1916
 URGES A COMMITTEE FOR NEW YORK BILLS in NYT on January 3, 1917

140
1917 in New York (state)
New York